Husky Field is the home stadium for the Division I (NCAA) Houston Baptist Huskies softball team. Located at the corner of Beechnut Street and Bonhomme Road at Campus Gate 3 and across from the similarly named Husky Field baseball stadium on the campus of Houston Baptist University, the stadium features chairback and bleacher back seating for 300 fans.  The stadium has bullpens, dugouts, a press box, enclosed hitting area, and an electronic scoreboard.

Admission to Houston Baptist Husky softball games is free.

The initial home game was played in 1993.

References

External links 
 Houston Baptist Huskies Softball Official Website

Houston Christian Huskies softball
College softball venues in the United States
Softball venues in Houston
Sports venues completed in 1993
1993 establishments in Texas